Pterolophia subtubericollis is a species of beetle in the family Cerambycidae. It was described by Stephan von Breuning in 1964.

References

subtubericollis
Beetles described in 1964